Valeri Sergeyevich Vasilyev (born May 31, 1994) is a Russian professional ice hockey defenceman. He is currently playing with Sokol Krasnoyarsk of the Supreme Hockey League (VHL). Vasilyev was selected by the Philadelphia Flyers in the 7th round (201st overall) of the 2012 NHL Entry Draft.

Playing career
Vasilyev made his Kontinental Hockey League (KHL) debut playing with HC Spartak Moscow during the 2012–13 season.

In the 2018–19 season, Vasilyev while in his second season with the Severstal Cherepovets, was traded to Metallurg Magnitogorsk on December 27, 2018. He was signed to an improved two-year contract to remain with Metallurg until 2020.

Approaching the final year of his contract, Vasilyev was traded by Metallurg alongside Nikita Yazkov to Amur Khabarovsk in exchange for financial compensation on May 2, 2019.

Career statistics

Regular season and playoffs

International

References

External links

1994 births
Living people
Amur Khabarovsk players
Avangard Omsk players
Avtomobilist Yekaterinburg players
Metallurg Magnitogorsk players
Philadelphia Flyers draft picks
Russian ice hockey defencemen
Severstal Cherepovets players
Sokol Krasnoyarsk players
HC Spartak Moscow players
Ice hockey people from Moscow
Torpedo Nizhny Novgorod players